The Battle of Poison Spring was fought in Ouachita County, Arkansas on April 18, 1864, as part of the Camden Expedition, during the American Civil War. A Union force commanded by Major General Frederick Steele had moved from Little Rock, Arkansas towards Shreveport, Louisiana in support of Major-General Nathaniel Banks' move up the Red River towards Shreveport. After Banks was defeated at the battles of Mansfield and Pleasant Hill, Steele was isolated in Arkansas. Short on supplies, Steele sent a detachment commanded by Colonel James M. Williams to search for supplies. Williams' column was attacked by Confederate troops under the command of Brigadiers General John S. Marmaduke and Samuel B. Maxey. After a sharp fight, Williams' command was routed, losing its wagon train and four cannons. The defeat at Poison Spring and another defeat at the Battle of Marks' Mills a week later led Steele to retreat to Little Rock. The battle is infamous for the Confederates' slaughter and mutilation of African-American Union soldiers of the 1st Kansas Colored Infantry. Poison Springs Battleground State Park, which is part of the Camden Expedition Sites National Historic Landmark, preserves a portion of the site of the battle.

Background

In late 1863, during the American Civil War, Union leadership was interested in sending an expedition to attack the Confederate state of Texas. Major-General Nathaniel Banks began making preparations for an invasion of Texas via the Gulf of Mexico, but Major-General Henry Halleck, Union general-in-chief, preferred an advance along the Red River. Halleck outranked Banks, so Banks was eventually forced to accept Halleck's attack plan. It was determined that Banks would lead a force along the course of the Red River, while Major General Frederick Steele would move southward through Arkansas to join Banks eventually.  The Confederate forces in the region were part of the Trans-Mississippi Department,  which was commanded by Lieutenant-General E. Kirby Smith from his headquarters in Shreveport, Louisiana. Banks' advance up the Red River was contested by the forces of Major-General Richard Taylor, one of Smith's subordinates. Taylor attacked and defeated Banks at the Battle of Mansfield on April 8, 1864. The next day, Taylor assaulted Banks' new position during the Battle of Pleasant Hill but was repulsed by the Union army. Despite winning a tactical victory over Taylor at Pleasant Hill, Banks abandoned his campaign and retreated. Banks' retreat left Steele's army in Arkansas on its own.

Steele had been hesitant to attempt the movement towards Shreveport due to the difficulty of maintaining a supply line while moving through Arkansas. Two Union forces were intended to partake in the advance: a 3,600-man force commanded by Brigadier-General John M. Thayer, which was located at Fort Smith, Arkansas, and Steele's main 6,800-man force, which had been camped at Little Rock, Arkansas.  Many of the Confederate troops in the area had been moved south by Smith to oppose Banks' advance. The Confederate units that remained in Arkansas were under the command of Major General Sterling Price. Price attempted to slow Steele's march through delaying tactics, as Smith hoped to defeat Banks' column while Price kept Steele occupied. In one such delaying action, the Battle of Elkin's Ferry, Confederate cavalry under brigadiers-general John S. Marmaduke and Joseph O. Shelby attacked Steele's column while it was still separated from Thayer's, but were repulsed. On April 9, 1864, Thayer's Union column joined Steele.

Steele's combined force began to have supply issues, especially the lack of food. This forced Steele to request that a supply train be sent to his army from Little Rock. Despite the supply issues, Steele advanced to Prairie D'Ane on April 10 and defeated Price at the Battle of Prairie D'Ane.  However, lack of supplies forced Steele's Union force to head east towards Camden, Arkansas after Prairie D'Ane. Meanwhile, Price was reinforced on April 13 by a division commanded by Brigadier-General Samuel B. Maxey, which included a brigade of Confederate-sympathizing Native Americans under Colonel Tandy Walker.  By April 15, Steele's Union forces had occupied Camden. Lack of supplies continued to be an issue for the Union forces; Steele dispatched approximately 1,100 men under the command of Colonel James M. Williams on April 17 to search for food.

Battle

Williams' command consisted of the 1st Kansas Infantry (Colored), the 18th Iowa Infantry, four cannons, and elements of several cavalry regiments. The Confederates learned of the supply train and sent a force composed of Marmaduke's cavalry and a brigade commanded by Brigadier General William L. Cabell. This force was later augmented by Maxey's Confederate division, giving the Confederates a total strength of about 3,500 available men. Marmaduke had been in command of the force, but as Maxey had seniority over Marmaduke, Maxey took overall command.  The Confederate plan of battle was to block the path of the wagon train with Marmaduke and Cabell's troops, and then Maxey's division would take the halted train in the flank. As planned, Williams' Union force was blocked by Marmaduke and Cabell on April 18, and Maxey's division, composed of a brigade of Texans under Colonel Charles DeMorse and Walker's Native Americans, hit the flank of Williams' column. However, Maxey's initial assault was repulsed by the 1st Kansas (Colored). The next Confederate charge was more coordinated, with Marmaduke and Maxey attacking the Union force simultaneously.

After a fight of about an hour, Maxey's men were again forced to retreat, but the Union soldiers began to run low on ammunition. A third Confederate charge broke the flank of the Union position, and the 1st Kansas (Colored) abandoned its position. The 18th Iowa attempted to form a second line but was quickly driven off by the Confederate assault.  The African-American soldiers of the 1st Kansas (Colored) were "showed [..] no quarter".  Many of the members of the Kansas regiment who fell into Confederate hands were killed and mutilated; some observers reported that Walker's Choctaws took scalps from dead Union soldiers. Walker would later write:

Williams' Union column lost 301 men. The 1st Kansas (Colored) lost 182 men out of 438 men who had participated in the battle. 117 of the 182 losses in the Kansas regiment were killed, which was an unusually high killed-to-wounded ratio. In comparison, the Confederates lost 114 men. The Confederates also captured four cannons and 175 wagons. Within the wagons were 5,000 bushels of corn and non-military items such as furniture and civilian clothing.

Aftermath and preservation
A week later, on April 25, another Union wagon train was captured at the Battle of Marks' Mills. With his forces' lack of supplies, especially food, becoming increasingly problematic, Steele decided to give up on his campaign and withdraw from Camden. Some Confederate forces that had been shifted south to fight Banks were returned to Arkansas. The now-strengthened Confederate force pursued Steele and caught up with the Union soldiers while they were trying to cross the Saline River. On April 30, the Confederates attacked Steele's position near the river in the Battle of Jenkins' Ferry. Steele's forces repulsed the Confederate attacks, allowing the Union soldiers to cross the river. Steele's retreat ended on May 2 when the Union forces reached Little Rock.  Steele's force is estimated to have traveled around 275 miles throughout the entire campaign.

The site of the battlefield is preserved within Poison Springs Battleground State Park, which is part of the Camden Expedition Sites National Historic Landmark. The Camden Expedition Sites National Historic Landmark, which includes the Poison Spring battleground as well as other sites related to Steele's campaign, was listed on the National Register of Historic Places in 1994.

See also  
List of American Civil War battles
Troop engagements of the American Civil War, 1864

References

Sources

Further reading
 Battle description in the Arkansas Historical Quarterly, Volume XXVIII (Winter 1959), p. 338

External links

 Battle of Poison Spring at the American Battlefield Protection Program
 Battle of Poison Spring at the Encyclopedia of Arkansas
 Regimental Colors of the 1st Colored Infantry at the Kansas Historical Society

 
1864 in Arkansas
April 1864 events
Battle of Poison Spring
Battles of the American Civil War in Arkansas
Battles of the Trans-Mississippi Theater of the American Civil War
Camden Expedition
Confederate victories of the American Civil War
Conflicts in 1864
Battle of Poison Spring
Massacres of the American Civil War
Confederate war crimes